Arturo Esteban Martínez Rivera (born October 11, 1982 in Ciudad de México, Distrito Federal) is a male judoka from Mexico. He participated in the 2008 Summer Olympics.

References

External links
 
sports-reference

1982 births
Living people
Mexican male judoka
Olympic judoka of Mexico
Judoka at the 2003 Pan American Games
Judoka at the 2008 Summer Olympics
Sportspeople from Mexico City
Pan American Games competitors for Mexico